Zoltán Molnár may refer to:

 Zoltán Molnár (footballer, born 1971), Hungarian footballer 
 Zoltán Molnár (footballer, born 1973), Hungarian footballer
 Zoltán Molnár (rower) (born 1961), Hungarian rower